Laura Slade Weishaar (née Wiggins) (born August 8, 1988) is an American actress, singer and musician. She is most known for her roles in Shameless, The Tomorrow People, Starving in Suburbia  and Rings.

Early life
Wiggins was born in Athens, Georgia, the daughter of Kathy Wiggins and prominent Athens attorney Mark Wiggins. She has one brother.

Career
She has guest starred in various shows including Eleventh Hour, and in an episode of CSI: Crime Scene Investigation titled "World's End". She also played a pregnant teenager in an episode of the fourth season of Private Practice called "The Hardest Part". She had a recurring role in the 2013 series The Tomorrow People. Wiggins joined the Showtime dramedy Shameless, as Karen Jackson, a series regular.

In 2014, Wiggins appeared in the Law & Order: Special Victims Unit episode "Comic Perversion" as Carly Rydell. Wiggins played the main character "Hannah Warner" in Starving in Suburbia which aired on Lifetime on April 26, 2014. In 2017, Wiggins appeared in the horror film Rings, the third installment of the Ring franchise. In 2019, she played a supporting role in the Nancy Drew and the Hidden Staircase.

Personal life
Wiggins married stuntman Kyle Weishaar in Colbert, Georgia on June 23, 2018. In 2021, she had a daughter.

Filmography

Film

Television

References

External links

 

1988 births
Living people
Actresses from Georgia (U.S. state)
American child actresses
American film actresses
American women singer-songwriters
American television actresses
Musicians from Athens, Georgia
Musicians from Georgia (U.S. state)
21st-century American singers
21st-century American women singers
Singer-songwriters from Georgia (U.S. state)